Tamale North is one of the constituencies represented in the Parliament of Ghana. It elects one Member of Parliament (MP) by the first past the post system of election. Tamale North is located in the Tamale Municipal district  of the Northern Region of Ghana.

This seat was created prior to the  Ghanaian parliamentary election in 2004.

Boundaries
The seat is located within the Tamale Municipal district of the Northern Region of Ghana.

Members of Parliament

Elections

See also
List of Ghana Parliament constituencies

References 

Parliamentary constituencies in the Northern Region (Ghana)
2004 establishments in Ghana